Longmorn railway station served the village of Longmorn, Moray, Scotland from 1862 to 1968 on the Morayshire Railway.

History 
The station opened on 1 March 1862 by the Morayshire Railway. On the northbound platform was the station building. To the west was the goods yard and to the northwest was the signal box. The goods yard served the Longmorn, Benriach and Glenlossie distilleries. The signal box closed in 1967. The station closed to both passengers and goods traffic on 6 May 1968.

References

External links 

Disused railway stations in Moray
Railway stations in Great Britain opened in 1862
Railway stations in Great Britain closed in 1968
Beeching closures in Scotland
Former Great North of Scotland Railway stations
1862 establishments in Scotland
1968 disestablishments in Scotland